Souls in the System is a top-down view scrolling shooter video game created by a company called Terminal Sunset for the Macintosh. This game is a sequel to ShadowWraith. It was designed and developed by Ravi J.K. Mehta of Terminal Sunset Software.

The cover illustration was designed by Peter Bollinger and came with the CD containing the program and music files.
, the StarPlay online product catalog indicated that the company was no longer selling games directly.

References

External links
 StarPlay Productions - Souls in the System (archived resource)
 StarPlay Technical Support - Souls in the System (archived resource)

1996 video games
Classic Mac OS games
Classic Mac OS-only games
Scrolling shooters
Video games developed in the United States
Video game sequels